The Ida M. Rice House, also known as Haskell House, is a Colonial Revival style building in Colorado Springs, Colorado that was built in 1927.  It was designed by Thomas P. Barber.

It was listed on the National Register of Historic Places in 2006.

It's now featured on a Colorado Springs walking tour.

See also
National Register of Historic Places listings in El Paso County, Colorado

References

Houses on the National Register of Historic Places in Colorado
Colonial Revival architecture in Colorado
Houses completed in 1927
Buildings and structures in Colorado Springs, Colorado
Houses in El Paso County, Colorado
National Register of Historic Places in Colorado Springs, Colorado